Veresk (also known as Varīsk) is a village in Rastupey Rural District, in the Central District of Savadkuh County, Mazandaran Province, Iran. At the 2006 census, its population was 1,460, in 398 families.

References 

Populated places in Savadkuh County